Jennifer Peedom is a BAFTA-nominated Australian director.

Her documentary Solo (co-directed with David Michôd) won the 2009 Australian Film Institute Award for Best Documentary in Under One Hour. 

Her film Sherpa, which was filmed during the 2014 Mount Everest avalanche, won the 2015 Grierson Award for Best Documentary at the BFI London Film Festival. It premiered internationally at the Telluride Film Festival and also screened at Toronto Film Festival and received a BAFTA nomination in 2016 for Best Documentary.

In 2017 she directed Mountain, a collaboration the Australian Chamber Orchestra (ACO) with script by Robert Macfarlane, narrated by Willem Dafoe. It screened theatrically in 27 countries and went on to become the highest grossing non-IMAX Australian documentary of all time
(third).  It won three AACTA Awards  in 2018.

In 2021 Peedom co-directed, with Joseph Nizeti, River, a documentary about rivers with a similar scope and format as Mountain. The film is also written by Macfarlane, narrated by Dafoe, and accompanied by a soundtrack by the ACO.

Peedom is married to stills photographer, Mark Rogers. They have two children, Tashi and Luca.

References

Australian film producers
Australian film directors
Australian women film directors
Australian documentary filmmakers
Year of birth missing (living people)
People educated at Trinity College (University of Melbourne)
Living people